The Summit County Courthouse in Coalville, Utah, on Main St., was built in 1903.  It was listed on the National Register of Historic Places in 1978.

Its construction settled a running dispute about where the county seat would be located.  The newspaper of Park City, Utah was disappointed but came around to agree that the building would serve the county well.

It was designed by F.C. Woods & Co. of Ogden, Utah, and it was built by contractors E. J. Beggs & J. H. Salmon.

It is Romanesque Revival in style.

References

Courthouses in Utah
National Register of Historic Places in Summit County, Utah
Romanesque Revival architecture in Utah
Government buildings completed in 1903
1903 establishments in Utah